Clifton Gardens is a neighborhood and census-designated place (CDP) within the town of Clifton Park, Saratoga County, New York, United States. It was first listed as a CDP prior to the 2020 census.

The community is in southern Saratoga County, in the eastern part of Clifton Park. It is bordered to the north by Clifton Park Center Road and Sitterly Road, to the east by Interstate 87, to the south by Grooms Road, and to the west by Moe Road. The CDP of Clifton Knolls-Mill Creek borders Clifton Gardens to the west across Moe Road.

Demographics

References 

Census-designated places in Saratoga County, New York
Census-designated places in New York (state)